Wholesale District may refer to some city districts in the United States

 Wholesale District, Los Angeles, California
 Wholesale District, Indianapolis, Indiana
 Wholesale District (Kansas City, Missouri), listed on the NRHP in Missouri